Pedro Mercado (29 June 1923 – 2 April 2001) was an Argentine equestrian. He competed in two events at the 1952 Summer Olympics.

References

1923 births
2001 deaths
Argentine male equestrians
Olympic equestrians of Argentina
Equestrians at the 1952 Summer Olympics
Pan American Games medalists in equestrian
Pan American Games gold medalists for Argentina
Equestrians at the 1951 Pan American Games
Sportspeople from Mendoza Province
Medalists at the 1951 Pan American Games